Paul Kelly (born 28 July 1969) is a former Australian rules footballer, winner of the Brownlow Medal and captain of the Sydney Swans for ten seasons. He was and still is known to Swans fans everywhere as "Captain Courageous".

Born in Wagga Wagga, New South Wales, Kelly initially played rugby league for Wagga Brothers but turned to Australian rules football at age 15.  Recruited to the AFL by the Swans, Kelly made his debut in 1990 after being the best player in his school, and was appointed captain in 1993, won the Brownlow Medal (the AFL's highest individual honour) in 1995, won club best and fairests in 1992, 1993, 1996 and 1997, All-Australian selection in 1995, 1996 and 1997 (the last two as captain), and the AFL Players Association's Robert Rose Award for Most Courageous Player in 1994, 1995, 1996, 1997 and 2000.

Kelly led the Swans to the AFL Grand Final in 1996—its first since 1945—and was considered one of the best players in the competition during the mid-1990s, but from 1998 onwards was severely hampered by injuries. Kelly retired after 234 AFL games and served as the Swans runner in 2003 before retiring to his farm near Wagga Wagga. His autobiography, Swan Song, was published in 2003 and covers the period until his retirement from football. His No. 14 jumper has since been retired for 5 years, before it was brought out again, this time to be worn by Craig Bird.

In 2005, Kelly was on hand to present the premiership cup to Paul Roos and Barry Hall after the Swans' nailbiting 4-point Grand Final win.

In 2006, he presented the Brownlow Medal to former team mate, Adam Goodes.

He was inducted into the Australian Football Hall of Fame in July, 2007.

Statistics

|- style="background-color: #EAEAEA"
! scope="row" style="text-align:center" | 1990
|style="text-align:center;"|
| 45 || 10 || 2 || 4 || 48 || 43 || 91 || 15 || 8 || 0.2 || 0.4 || 4.8 || 4.3 || 9.1 || 1.5 || 0.8
|-
! scope="row" style="text-align:center" | 1991
|style="text-align:center;"|
| 14 || 20 || 14 || 20 || 219 || 173 || 392 || 52 || 51 || 0.7 || 1.0 || 11.0 || 8.7 || 19.6 || 2.6 || 2.6
|- style="background:#eaeaea;"
! scope="row" style="text-align:center" | 1992
|style="text-align:center;"|
| 14 || 22 || 8 || 16 || 310 || 216 || 526 || 63 || 73 || 0.4 || 0.7 || 14.1 || 9.8 || 23.9 || 2.9 || 3.3
|-
! scope="row" style="text-align:center" | 1993
|style="text-align:center;"|
| 14 || 20 || 11 || 6 || 269 || 153 || 422 || 55 || 67 || 0.6 || 0.3 || 13.5 || 7.7 || 21.1 || 2.8 || 3.4
|- style="background:#eaeaea;"
! scope="row" style="text-align:center" | 1994
|style="text-align:center;"|
| 14 || 18 || 15 || 12 || 226 || 206 || 432 || 70 || 42 || 0.8 || 0.7 || 12.6 || 11.4 || 24.0 || 3.9 || 2.3
|-
! scope="row" style="text-align:center" | 1995
|style="text-align:center;"|
| 14 || 22 || 15 || 11 || 285 || 153 || 438 || 68 || 77 || 0.7 || 0.5 || 13.0 || 7.0 || 19.9 || 3.1 || 3.5
|- style="background:#eaeaea;"
! scope="row" style="text-align:center" | 1996
|style="text-align:center;"|
| 14 || 25 || 18 || 13 || 371 || 205 || 576 || 128 || 70 || 0.7 || 0.5 || 14.8 || 8.2 || 23.0 || 5.1 || 2.8
|-
! scope="row" style="text-align:center" | 1997
|style="text-align:center;"|
| 14 || 23 || 26 || 30 || 376 || 178 || 554 || 100 || 40 || 1.1 || 1.3 || 16.3 || 7.7 || 24.1 || 4.3 || 1.7
|-style="background:#eaeaea;"
! scope="row" style="text-align:center" | 1998
|style="text-align:center;"|
| 14 || 16 || 27 || 11 || 229 || 108 || 337 || 64 || 28 || 1.7 || 0.7 || 14.3 || 6.8 || 21.1 || 4.0 || 1.8
|-
! scope="row" style="text-align:center" | 1999
|style="text-align:center;"|
| 14 || 21 || 28 || 25 || 267 || 137 || 404 || 86 || 29 || 1.3 || 1.2 || 12.7 || 6.5 || 19.2 || 4.1 || 1.4
|-style="background:#eaeaea;"
! scope="row" style="text-align:center" | 2000
|style="text-align:center;"|
| 14 || 8 || 10 || 2 || 67 || 38 || 105 || 31 || 16 || 1.3 || 0.3 || 8.4 || 4.8 || 13.1 || 3.9 || 2.0
|-
! scope="row" style="text-align:center" | 2001
|style="text-align:center;"|
| 14 || 11 || 13 || 11 || 117 || 48 || 165 || 52 || 28 || 1.2 || 1.0 || 10.6 || 4.4 || 15.0 || 4.7 || 2.5
|-style="background:#eaeaea;"
! scope="row" style="text-align:center" | 2002
|style="text-align:center;"|
| 14 || 18 || 13 || 13 || 200 || 135 || 335 || 61 || 65 || 0.7 || 0.7 || 11.1 || 7.5 || 18.6 || 3.4 || 3.6
|- class="sortbottom"
! colspan=3| Career
! 234
! 200
! 174
! 2984
! 1793
! 4777
! 845
! 594
! 0.9
! 0.7
! 12.8
! 7.7
! 20.4
! 3.6
! 2.5
|}

Honours and achievements

Team
McClelland Trophy (Sydney): 1996
Individual
Brownlow Medal: 1995
Bob Skilton Medal (Sydney Swans Best & Fairest): 1992, 1993, 1996, 1997
All-Australian: 1995, 1996, 1997
AFLPA Best Captain Award: 1999
AFLPA Robert Rose Most Courageous Player Award: 1994, 1995, 1996, 1997, 2000
Sydney Swans Captain: 1993-2002
Sydney Swans Team of the Century - Forward Pocket (Vice-Captain)
Australian Football Hall of Fame inductee: 2007

References

External links 

 
 

1969 births
Living people
Australian rules footballers from New South Wales
Sydney Swans players
Bob Skilton Medal winners
All-Australians (AFL)
Brownlow Medal winners
Australian Football Hall of Fame inductees
Sportspeople from Wagga Wagga
Australian people of Irish descent
Allies State of Origin players
New South Wales Australian rules football State of Origin players